The Bucharest Bible, also known as the Cantacuzino Bible, was the first complete translation of the Bible into the Romanian language, published in Bucharest in 1688. It was ordered and patronized by Șerban Cantacuzino, then-ruler of Wallachia, and overseen by logothete Constantin Brâncoveanu.

It is a compilation based on a "Frankfurt Septuagint" from 1597 compared with a Venetian Bible printed in 1687 both translated by the Greceanu brothers, an Old Testament by Nicolae Milescu and a New Testament of Transylvania's Metropolitan Simion Stefan from 1648 patronized by Prince György Rákóczi.

The translation project started somewhere in 1682. the material being collected and organized by Archbishop Germanus of Nyssa from the Patriarchal Academy of Constantinople, Sevastos Kyminitis from the Greek School of Bucharest, Radu Greceanu, and Stefan Greceanu. None of them is mentioned in the book. The printing run began on 5 November 1687 and ended on 10 November 1688. It was printed in the Metropolitanate's Press of Bucharest under the see of Theodosius, Metropolitan of Hungro-Wallachia.

It was a milestone for the Romanian culture and for the Romanian Language to be used in the church. At the time, Romanian language was despised and not used in the Romanian Church

See also
 Bible translations into Romanian

References

 Constantin C. Giurescu, Istoria Bucureștilor. Din cele mai vechi timpuri pînă în zilele noastre, Editura pentru Literatură, Bucharest, 1966

External links

1688 books
Romanian books
History of the Romanian language
Romanian Orthodox Church
History of Wallachia (1512–1714)
Bible
Bucharest
History of Christianity in Romania